Mordellistena paraweisei is a species of beetle in the genus Mordellistena of the family Mordellidae. It was described by Ermisch in 1977 and is endemic to Romania.

References

Beetles described in 1977
paraweisei
Endemic fauna of Romania
Beetles of Europe